Ptychadena porosissima is a species of frog in the family Ptychadenidae.
It is found in Angola, Democratic Republic of the Congo, Ethiopia, Kenya, Malawi, Rwanda, South Africa, Eswatini, Tanzania, Uganda, Zambia, Zimbabwe, possibly Burundi, possibly Lesotho, and possibly Mozambique.
Its natural habitats are temperate forest, subtropical or tropical moist montane forest, moist savanna, subtropical or tropical moist shrubland, temperate grassland, subtropical or tropical seasonally wet or flooded lowland grassland, subtropical or tropical high-altitude grassland, swamps, intermittent freshwater marshes, pastureland, rural gardens, and heavily degraded former forest.

References

Ptychadena
Taxonomy articles created by Polbot
Amphibians described in 1867